Aghcheh Qeshlaq-e Olya, also rendered as Aqcheh Qeshlaq-e Olya, also known as Aqcheh Qeshlaq-e Bala, may refer to:
 Aghcheh Qeshlaq-e Olya, Ardabil
 Aghcheh Qeshlaq-e Olya, East Azerbaijan